The Edinburgh South by-election of 29 May 1957 was held after the resignation of Unionist Party MP William Darling.

The seat was safe, having been won for the Unionists by Darling at the 1955 general election by a majority of nearly 13,000 votes

Result of the previous general election

Result of the by-election

See also
February 1886 Edinburgh South by-election
1899 Edinburgh South by-election
1910 Edinburgh South by-election
1917 Edinburgh South by-election

References

1957 in Scotland
1950s elections in Scotland
1957 elections in the United Kingdom
South, 1957
1950s in Edinburgh
May 1957 events in the United Kingdom